Antti Kalervo Leppänen (November 23, 1947 – August 5, 2015) was a professional ice hockey goaltender who played in the SM-liiga. Born in Tampere, he played for Tappara.  He was inducted into the Finnish Hockey Hall of Fame in 1990.

References

External links
 Finnish Hockey Hall of Fame bio

1947 births
2015 deaths
Ice hockey players at the 1976 Winter Olympics
Olympic ice hockey players of Finland
Tappara players
Finnish ice hockey goaltenders